Kontela is a commune in the Cercle of Bafoulabé in the Kayes Region of south-western Mali. The commune contains 28 villages and hamlets. The principal village (chef-lieu) is Goundara. In the 2009 census the commune had a population of 21,538.

References

External links
 Kontela at csa-mali.org

Communes of Kayes Region